Orthaga rubridiscalis is a species of snout moth in the genus Orthaga. It is found in Australia and the Louisiade Archipelago.

References

Moths described in 1906
Epipaschiinae